Arthur Fairclough (born March 1873 in Barnsley, England) was the manager of Barnsley, Huddersfield Town, and Leeds United.  He won the FA Cup with Barnsley and the Football League Second Division with Leeds United.

He started his managerial career with Barnsley, being there between 1898 until 1901. He was replaced by John McCartney until 1904, when he came back as manager until 1912, and won the FA Cup with them in his last season in charge (of his 2nd spell). After his success at Barnsley, he was persuaded to join Huddersfield where he laid the groundwork for the success to be achieved by Herbert Chapman. When Huddersfield chairman Hilton Crowther decided that a Leeds-based team would be a better vehicle for his attentions, he persuaded his manager to move with him, and so Fairclough took over from Dick Ray as Leeds United manager for the club's first full season in the Football League. Fairclough put together a useful team, and in 1923-24 he saw his side win promotion to the First Division. The following year saw the signing of the goal-scoring talents of Tom Jennings and Russell Wainscoat, to stand alongside the defensive abilities of Ernest Hart and Tom Townsley. Despite Jennings astonishing haul of 35 goals in 42 games, 1926-27 saw the side relegated and Fairclough resigned in the close season. He briefly returned to management with Barnsley in 1929, but resigned after a year in the job.

External links
Managerial Statistics @ Soccerbase.com
Full Managerial Stats for Leeds United from WAFLL

 

1873 births
Year of death missing
Sportspeople from Barnsley
English football managers
Barnsley F.C. managers
Huddersfield Town A.F.C. managers
Leeds United F.C. managers